Maria Mutch is a Canadian writer, whose memoir Know the Night: A Memoir of Survival in the Small Hours was a shortlisted nominee for the Governor General's Award for English-language non-fiction at the 2014 Governor General's Awards.

Originally from Kentville, Nova Scotia, Mutch was educated at York University. She published Know the Night as a memoir of her experience as the mother of a son with autism.

Mutch currently lives in Rhode Island. She has also published essays and short fiction in both Canadian and American literary magazines. Her first novel, Molly Falls to Earth, was published in 2020.

References

Writers from Halifax, Nova Scotia
Living people
Canadian memoirists
Canadian expatriate writers in the United States
York University alumni
Canadian women short story writers
21st-century Canadian women writers
21st-century Canadian short story writers
21st-century Canadian novelists
21st-century Canadian essayists
Year of birth missing (living people)
Canadian women essayists
Canadian women novelists
Canadian women memoirists
21st-century memoirists
People from Kentville, Nova Scotia